Felix Odei Annancy is an Anglican bishop  in Ghana: he is the current Bishop of Koforidua.

Annancy was ordained in 1988, before becoming, He served in Akosombo, Akuse, Nsawam and Kibi. He was Dean of Anglican Diocese of Koforidua before his consecration as bishop in 2017.

References

Anglican bishops of Koforidua
21st-century Anglican bishops in Ghana
Year of birth missing (living people)
Living people